Yr rune may be:
 , a historical rune of the Younger Futhark, see Yr rune (Younger Futhark)
 , a variant of the u rune to express the Old English  phoneme in Anglo-Saxon runic manuscript tradition, see Ur (rune)
a rune in the Armanen Futharkh of Guido von List
a rune in the rune row of Karl Maria Wiligut